Brace(s) or bracing may refer to:

Medical
 Orthopaedic brace, a device used to restrict or assist body movement
 Back brace, a device limiting motion of the spine
 Milwaukee brace, a kind of back brace used in the treatment of spinal curvatures
 Boston brace, a kind of back brace used in the treatment of spinal curvatures
 Cervical collar, also called a neck brace, used to restrict neck movement
 Dental braces, a device used to reposition teeth

Clothing
 Brace (armor), a shortened form of vambrace
 Braces (clothing), elastic fabric straps used to support trousers (known in American English as suspenders)

Construction and industrial arts
 Brace (tool), a hand tool for drilling holes, also known as a bit brace 
 Brace (theatre), a stabilizer for a piece of scenery
 A reinforcement used in architecture, such as in timber framing
 Wheel brace, aka lug wrench, used to remove nuts or bolts holding wheels to a vehicle 
 Aircraft bracing, struts and wires which stiffen and strengthen the airframe
 Cross brace, a cross-beam connecting between arches that is meant to add rigidity to the construction of mining tunnels
 Cross bracing, a system utilized to reinforce building structures in which diagonal supports intersect
 Guy-wire, a tensioned cable designed to add stability to a free-standing structure

People
 Brace (surname)
 Brace (singer) (born 1986), Dutch singer
 Brace Arquiza (born 2000), Filipino actor, model, dancer and singer
 Brace Beemer (born 1902), American radio actor and announcer
 Brace Belden (born 1989), American leftist

Places
 Brace Brook, tributary of the Lackawanna River in Pennsylvania
 Brace Farm, historic home and farm in New York
 Brace Hill, mountain located in the Catskill Mountains
 Brace Mountain, the peak of a ridge in the southern Taconic Mountains
 Braces Point, northeast point of Vindication Island, South Sandwich Islands
 Meole Brace, suburb of Shrewsbury, Shropshire, England

Posture
 Brace position, a body stance used to prepare for a crash
 Military brace, a body posture primarily used in military schools

Music
 Brace (music), connecting two staves
 Guitar bracing, internal reinforcements of a classical or acoustic guitar
 Brace (album), a 2016 album by Birds of Tokyo
 "Brace" (song), the album's title song
 Brace (singer) (born 1986), Dutch singer
 DJ Brace (born 1980), DJ and producer

Sports
 Brace (sports), a term meaning "scoring twice in a game" in a number of sports (cf., hat-trick)
 Brace (MMA), MMA organization

Other meanings
 Brace (sailing), the lines used to rotate the yards around the mast
 Braces (punctuation), the "{" and "}" symbols, i.e., "curly brackets"
 Curly bracket programming language, a programming language that uses braces
 Bracing style, a type of indent style used in computer programming
 "Braces" (Care Bears episode), an episode of Care Bears

See also
 Bracer, a strap or sheath used in archery
 Bracket (disambiguation)
 BRAC (disambiguation)
 Support (disambiguation)